Kristoffer Zegers (born 27 December 1973) is a Dutch composer.

Life
Zegers was born in Breda, and was taught by Gilius van Bergeijk, Jan Boerman, Martijn Padding, Clarence Barlow, Diderik Wagenaar at the Royal Conservatory of The Hague.

Career
In Zegers' music microtonal clusters are the main object. His music is about slow developments in clusters via glissandi. 
Because of that: his motto "Glissandéz mes enfants, Glissandéz toujours!" after César Franck: "Moduléz mes enfants, Moduléz toujours!".

Zegers most important work is Pianophasing, composition for 20 to 60 pianos. This work is played in the United Kingdom, Australia and several places in The Netherlands.

Important works
Pianophasing    (2004) (Novembermusic the Netherlands)
Pianophasing II (2009) (Huddersfield Contemporary Music Festival, England)
Pianophasing III (2012) (the Soundstream Festival in Adelaide Australia)

External links
Kristoffer Zegers
 Pianophasing Shortlisted: Royal Philharmonic Society Music Awards
 Documentary film Pianophasing II Huddersfield Contemporary Music Festival, Huddersfield England
 Pianophasing II Huddersfield Contemporary Music Festival,  Huddersfield England
 Novembermusic in the Netherlands
Music Center Netherlands, about Zegers
 Soundstream Festival Australia 2012

1973 births
Living people
20th-century classical composers
Dutch male classical composers
Dutch classical composers
People from Breda
 
Royal Conservatory of The Hague alumni
20th-century Dutch male musicians